René Marigil (24 October 1928 – 25 October 2009) was a Spanish professional racing cyclist. He rode in four editions of the Tour de France.

Major results

1953
 1st Stage 3 Gran Premio Cataluña
1955
 3rd Overall Tour of Galicia
1956
 1st Overall Vuelta a Levante
 1st Stage 2 Vuelta a Mallorca
 9th Trofeo Masferrer
1957
 1st GP Pascuas
 1st Stage 2 Vuelta a Andalucía
 2nd Road race, National Road Championships
 2nd Overall Vuelta a Asturias
1st Stage 5
 3rd Overall Volta a Catalunya
 4th Overall Euskal Bizikleta
1958
 1st Stage 11 Vuelta a España
 10th Overall Volta a Catalunya
 10th Overall Vuelta a Andalucía
1959
 9th Overall Vuelta a Andalucía
1st Stage 7
1960
 1st Stage 4 Euskal Bizikleta
1961
 7th Subida a Arrate
 9th Overall Vuelta a Andalucía
1962
 1st Stage 7 Vuelta a Andalucía
 4th Overall Vuelta a Levante

References

External links
 

1928 births
2009 deaths
Spanish male cyclists
Sportspeople from Tarn (department)
Spanish Vuelta a España stage winners
Cyclists from Occitania (administrative region)